Florizel (1768–1791) was a British Thoroughbred racehorse.

 Florizel (The Winter's Tale), a fictional character in Shakespeare's The Winter's Tale
 SS Florizel, a passenger liner
 HMS Florizel (J404), a military ship

See also
 Florizel Street, the original name of the television series Coronation Street
 The Adventure of Prince Florizel and a Detective, a short story by Robert Louis Stevenson
 Florizel von Reuter (1890–1985), American-born violinist and composer
 Florizel Glasspole (1909–2000), the third Governor General of Jamaica